Eli Goree (born May 26, 1994) is a Canadian actor. He is best known for his roles as Quincy in HBO's Ballers, Malik in Da Kink in My Hair (2007–2009), Wells Jaha in the post-apocalyptic drama show The 100 (2014–2017), Joel Goodson in the supernatural horror show Dead of Summer, and Cassius Clay in Regina King's biographical drama film One Night in Miami... (2020). In 2018, he started a recurring role on the CW's TV series Riverdale, where he plays Munroe "Mad Dog" Moore.

Biography 
Goree grew up in Halifax, Nova Scotia. He was raised by a single mother. He began his acting career at age six in Sesame Park, the Canadian version of Sesame Street. In 2003, he hosted The Big Black Rap Show on the Dalhousie University campus radio station CKDU-FM. In 2006, he became one of the hosts for the last season of the CBC TV series Street Cents. In the same year, he also began working as a freelancing journalist for Canada Now.

Goree is a graduate of Prince Andrew High School.

From 2007 to 2009, he was cast as Malik in popular Global TV series Da Kink in My Hair. He also appeared in the Vision TV series Soul.

On stage, Goree played the lead role of Jake in the 2009 critically acclaimed play Secrets of a Black Boy.

Between 2010 and 2013, he appeared in the mockumentary Pure Pwnage as well as guest roles in The CW's fantasy horror series Supernatural, The CW's medical drama Emily Owens, M.D., Showcase's sci-fi miniseries Eve of Destruction and CTV's police crime drama Motive.

In 2014, he was cast as Wells Jaha, one of the main characters in the first season of The CW's post-apocalyptic drama show The 100.

His first significant role in a feature film was in the 2016 sports-drama film Race.

Goree played Joel, one of the main characters in the Freeform horror drama Dead of Summer. 

He appeared as Conner, an amputee war veteran, in the Amazon Prime Video science fiction series The Peripheral.

Filmography

Film

Television

Awards and nominations

References

External links 
 
 

1994 births
Black Nova Scotians
Canadian male film actors
Canadian male television actors
Canadian male voice actors
Male actors from Halifax, Nova Scotia
Black Canadian male actors
Living people
Canadian Film Centre alumni
21st-century Canadian male actors